These are the results for the girls' doubles event at the 2014 Summer Youth Olympics.

Anhelina Kalinina of Ukraine and Iryna Shymanovich of Belarus won the gold medal, defeating Darya Kasatkina and Anastasiya Komardina of Russia in the final, 6–4, 6–4.

Jeļena Ostapenko of Latvia and Akvilė Paražinskaitė of Lithuania won the bronze medal, defeating Sofia Kenin of USA and Renata Zarazúa of Mexico in the bronze-medal match, 6–3, 7–5.

Seeds

Main draw

Draw

References 
 Main draw

Girl's doubles